José Pedro Alberto (born August 2, 1987 in Luanda) better known as Mabiná is a retired Angolan football midfielder.

Career
Mabiná has played for Atlético Petróleos Luanda since the start of the 2006 Girabola season, although he was in their youth team for a number of years. In 2007, he was called up to the Angola football team for the first team. He won his first cap in late 2007, but was not called up again until 2008 where he participated in the 2010 FIFA World Cup qualification, which were unsuccessful.

He was called up to the 2010 African Nations Cup squad, and played in the first game of the tournament against Mali, which ended 4-4. He gave a sterling performance, and is set to challenge Locó for the regular right-back spot.

External links

1987 births
Living people
Footballers from Luanda
Angolan footballers
Angola international footballers
2010 Africa Cup of Nations players
Atlético Petróleos de Luanda players

Association football midfielders